José Manuel García-Margallo y Marfil (born 13 August 1944) is a Spanish politician who served as Minister of Foreign Affairs and Cooperation from 2011 to 2016. Since 2019, he has been a member of the European Parliament.

Early life and education
García-Margallo was born in Madrid. In 1960, he joined the Young Spanish Monarchists. He graduated in Law and Economics from the University of Deusto in Bilbao (1965) and subsequently received a master's degree in law (LLM) from Harvard University (1972). His great-grandfather was General Juan García y Margallo, who was killed in 1893 during the First Melillan campaign, otherwise known as the Margallo War.

Political career
In 1976, Margallo was one of the founding members of the center-right People's Party (Partido Popular), a party unrelated to the current party of the same name. In 1977, that party joined others in forming the Union of the Democratic Centre (UCD), a coalition which won the first democratic elections of the modern era in Spain and formed the government from 1977 to 1982. At the 1977 election, he was elected to the Congress of Deputies as member for the single member district of Melilla and was re-elected in 1979, although he lost his seat at the 1982 election to the PSOE.

After the UCD disbanded in 1983, Margallo joined the Democratic Popular Party (PDP) and returned to the Congress at the 1986 election in representation of Valencia, retaining his seat until 1994 when he resigned after being elected to the European Parliament.

Member of the European Parliament, 1994–2011
Throughout his time in the European Parliament, Margallo served on the Committee on Economic and Monetary Affairs and Industrial Policy; between 2002 and 2011, he was the committee's vice-chairman. In this capacity, he led the Parliament's work on the European Banking Authority (EBA). He also called for the creation of a European Financial Protection Fund that would bail out large banks in times of crisis and would be financed primarily by contributions from banks themselves.

Margallo also served on the Special Committee on the Financial, Economic and Social Crisis between 2009 and 2011 as well as on the Special Committee on the policy challenges and budgetary resources for a sustainable European Union after 2013 between 2010 and 2011. In addition to his committee assignments, he was a member of the parliament's delegation for relations with the countries of Central America.

Margallo led the EU-Election Observer Mission for the 2010 presidential election in Togo.

Foreign Minister of Spain, 2011–2016
On 22 December 2011, Margallo was inaugurated as Minister of Foreign Affairs and Cooperation in the first cabinet presided by Mariano Rajoy.

In March 2012, Margallo announced that, in response to savage killings and human rights abuses in Syria, his country would cease activities at its embassy in Damascus, but would not formally close its mission.

In November 2012, Margallo announced that Spain would follow France in announcing it will support a bid of the Palestinian National Authority for enhanced status at the United Nations when the issue goes to a vote of the General Assembly.

In 2014, amid negotiations towards an accord with the European Union aimed at opening up Cuba, Margallo irritated Raúl Castro's government with his call for Cuba to grant free travel rights to dissidents arrested in the Black Spring of 2003 and later released under strict conditions. During a visit to the country, Margallo was denied an audience with Castro and instead met with First Vice-President Miguel Díaz-Canel.

Following the Joint Comprehensive Plan of Action on the nuclear program of Iran in 2015, Margallo led a high-level government and business delegation to Iran, joining other countries drawn to Tehran by the possibility of lucrative opportunities that could be unlocked by a nuclear deal. A day after sanctions against Iran were lifted in January 2016, Margallo entered into negotiations with the Iranian government over the construction of an Iranian-owned oil refinery at the Gibraltar strait.

Almost 50 years after coming close to possibly provoking a nuclear disaster, Margallo and his counterpart John Kerry of the United States agreed in 2015 to remove contaminated soil from an area in southern Spain where an American warplane accidentally dropped hydrogen bombs. The deal, announced on a visit by Kerry to Spain, followed years of wrangling between the two countries over how to clean up the area around the seaside village of Palomares, over which the accident took place in 1966.

Later activity 
Margallo did not continue at the post of Foreign minister after the formation of the Second Rajoy Government in 2016. Margallo has later blamed his exit from the Council of Ministers to alleged machinations by Soraya Sáenz de Santamaría. He would remain nonetheless as member of the Congress of Deputies for the rest of its 12th term. Following the resignation of Rajoy to the leadership of the PP and the ensuing celebration of a leadership election in July 2018, Margallo contested the latter facing his bête noire Soraya Sáenz de Santamaría, in addition to another 4 candidates. Margallo commanded only 688 votes from among the party members. As only Sáenz de Santamaría and Pablo Casado passed to the second round, to be voted by party delegates, Margallo endorsed Casado.

Margallo was included 7th in the PP list for the 2019 European election. Once elected, he became a Member of the European Parliament again, after his 1994–2011 spell. In 2020, he joined the Subcommittee on Tax Matters.

In addition to his committee assignments, Margallo is part of the European Parliament Intergroup on Seas, Rivers, Islands and Coastal Areas.

Other activities
 Elcano Royal Institute for International and Strategic Studies, member of the board of trustees
 Instituto Cervantes, ex officio member of the board of trustees

Controversy

Often seen as a controversial figure, Margallo has often been critical of Gibraltar. In February 2015 he ordered the closure of the Instituto Cervantes in Gibraltar stating that there was no need for Spanish classes in Gibraltar as 'everyone speaks (Spanish) except for the apes'.

In June 2016 Margallo said Spain would demand control of Gibraltar the "very next day" after a British withdrawal from the EU. Under Margallo's leadership, the Foreign Ministry on 11 July 2016 summoned Britain's ambassador following what it said were "reckless" moves by a Royal Gibraltar Police patrol boat.

Works

References

External links

 
 

1944 births
Foreign ministers of Spain
Grand Cross of the Order of Civil Merit
Harvard Law School alumni
Living people
Members of the constituent Congress of Deputies (Spain)
Members of the 1st Congress of Deputies (Spain)
Members of the 3rd Congress of Deputies (Spain)
Members of the 4th Congress of Deputies (Spain)
Members of the 5th Congress of Deputies (Spain)
Members of the 12th Congress of Deputies (Spain)
MEPs for Spain 1994–1999
MEPs for Spain 1999–2004
MEPs for Spain 2004–2009
MEPs for Spain 2009–2014
MEPs for Spain 2019–2024
People's Party (Spain) MEPs
Politicians from Madrid
Recipients of the Order of the Liberator General San Martin
Union of the Democratic Centre (Spain) politicians
Politicians from the Valencian Community